"The Best of Me" is the debut solo single by David Foster, released in February 1983. The ballad was later included as the title track for his debut solo album with the same title, released in November 1983. The song was composed in 1982 by Foster, Jeremy Lubbock and Richard Marx. It has since been recorded by numerous artists, the most notable being Cliff Richard, who chose it for his 100th single milestone in 1989.

David Foster & Olivia Newton-John version

David Foster re-recorded the track with Olivia Newton-John for his 1986 self-titled solo album. It was released as a single and made No. 6 on the Billboard Adult Contemporary chart and No. 80 on the Billboard Hot 100 chart.

Track listing
 "The Best of Me" - 4:08
 "Sajé" - 3:08

Charts

Cliff Richard version (100th single)

English singer Cliff Richard selected the song for his milestone 100th single in 1989. Released on 30 May 1989, the song debuted at No. 2 on the UK Singles Chart and stayed there another week in its 7-week run on the chart. It was certified silver by the BPI for sales over 200,000.

Before releasing his 100th single, Richard invited 2,000 British fans to the London Palladium for a preview of six songs from his forthcoming album (which would be Stronger), to vote on which one they liked most as the possible 100th single. Ironically, "The Best of Me" came second to "Stronger Than That", but Richard had also revealed by mistake that the latter was composed by Alan Tarney who had written most of Richard's biggest hits since 1979. Regardless, it was enough confirmation for Richard to choose "The Best of Me" with its fitting lyrics as a tribute to his audience. Coming third in the vote was "I Just Don't Have the Heart", ahead of "Joanna" and "Lean on You".

Charts and certifications

Weekly charts

Year-end charts

Certifications

Other versions
Kenny Rogers studio track, The Heart of the Matter, 1985
Phil Perry studio track, The Heart of the Man album, 1991
Barry Manilow studio track, The Complete Collection and Then Some... album, 1992
Richard Marx live track, 2010
Michael Bublé studio track, Crazy Love (Hollywood edition bonus disc) album, 2010
Paul Potts studio track, Home album, 2014

References

1982 songs
1983 debut singles
1986 singles
1989 singles
Atlantic Records singles
EMI Records singles
Kenny Rogers songs
Cliff Richard songs
Olivia Newton-John songs
Pop ballads
Songs written by David Foster
Songs written by Richard Marx
Song recordings produced by George Martin
Male–female vocal duets
1980s ballads